Anantharam is a village in Rangareddy district in Telangana, India. It falls under Shamirpet mandal.

References

Villages in Ranga Reddy district